The 2020 Tulane Green Wave baseball team represents Tulane University in the 2020 NCAA Division I baseball season. The Green Wave play their home games at Greer Field at Turchin Stadium and are led by fourth year head coach Travis Jewett.

On March 16, the American Athletic Conference canceled all ongoing 2020 spring athletic meets/games as well as all conference tournament games. This came during the COVID-19 pandemic.

Preseason

American Athletic Conference Coaches Poll
The American Athletic Conference Coaches Poll was released on December 30, 2019 and the Wave were picked to finish fourth in the conference.

Preseason All-AAC Team
Grant Matthews – R-Sr, 1st Base
Jonathon Artigues – R-Sr, 2nd Base
Hudson Haskin – So, Outfield

Non-conference Preseason Honors

Reference(s):

Roster

Reference(s):

Coaching staff

Reference(s):

Schedule and results

Schedule Source:
*Rankings are based on the team's current ranking in the D1Baseball poll.

References

Tulane Green Wave
Tulane Green Wave baseball seasons
Tulane baseball